Atwan al-Atwani is an Iraqi politician and governor of Baghdad Governorate.

Biography
Al Atwani was born in Baghdad in 1973. He holds an engineering degree. He was elected in 2017 to become Governor of Baghdad Governorate.

References

Governors of Baghdad Governorate
Iraqi politicians
Iraqi soldiers
Living people
1973 births
People from Baghdad
Iraqi Shia Muslims